Kathleen Mary Lindsay (1903-1973), was an English writer of historical romance novels. For some years she held the record as the most prolific novelist in history.  According to Guinness World Records (1986 edition, where they refer to her under pen name of "Mary Faulkner"), she wrote 904 books under eleven pen names. This record has since been surpassed.

Life
Kathleen Mary Lindsay was born in Aldershot, Hampshire, England. She was married at least three times, one of her husbands being Percy Edward Jeffryes.  She wrote under all three married names as well as eight other pen names, using names of both sexes. These included Mary Faulkner, Margaret Cameron, Mary Richmond, Molly Waring, Betty Manvers, Elizabeth Fenton, Nigel Mackenzie and Hugh Desmond.

She seems to have lived in Western Australia and New Zealand at various times, however she later lived in Somerset West, Cape Province, South Africa, where she died.

Works
Her titles include There is No Yesterday and Wind of Desire.

In 1961, Lindsay was accused of plagiarism by the author Georgette Heyer, after a reader identified similarities between Lindsay's book Winsome Lass and Heyer's works.  Heyer sent a summary of the similarities to Lindsay's publisher, Robert Lusty of Hurst & Blackett, prompting Lindsay to reply, "What does it all amount to?  About four incidents and two lines."  Lindsay's dismissive response inspired Heyer to provide a detailed eleven-page analysis of the alleged plagiarisms cross referenced against eight of her own novels to her solicitor, who recommended an injunction.  The case never made it to court.

References

Sources and external links
FantasticFiction
AustLit
Classic Crime Fiction
Crime Fiction IV: A Comprehensive Bibliography, 1749–2000

1903 births
1973 deaths
Writers from Aldershot
English women novelists
Pseudonymous women writers
20th-century English women writers
20th-century English novelists
20th-century pseudonymous writers